Aramayoite (IMA symbol: Ary) is a mineral with the chemical formula . Its type locality is Sud Chichas, Potosí, Bolivia.

References

External links 

 Aramayoite data sheet
 Aramayoite on the Handbook of Mineralogy

Silver minerals
Antimony minerals
Bismuth minerals
Sulfur(−II) compounds